Harjinder Singh Jinda (3 April 1961 – 9 October 1992) was a member of the Sikh separatist group Khalistan Commando Force and one of the two assassins of Arun Vaidya (the Chief of Indian army at the time of Operation Blue Star and architect of Operation Blue Star). He was responsible for three high-profile assassinations; Arjan Dass, Lalit Maken and Gen. Vaidya. He along with other members of Khalistan Commando Force participated in Indian history's biggest bank robbery of Rs. 57.0 million ($4.5 million) from Punjab National Bank, Miller Gunj branch, Ludhiana to finance the campaign for a separate Sikh state of Khalistan.

Early life
Harjinder Singh's father's and mother's names are Gurnam Kaur and Gulzar Singh. Jinda had two older brothers, Nirbhail Singh and Bhupinder Singh and one sister, Balvinder Kaur. Harinder Singh alias Mathra Singh and Jagjit Singh were nephews of Harjinder Singh Jinda. Sikh khadku Surjit Singh Penta (who committed suicide by consuming cyanide during Operation Black Thunder in the year of 1988) was a nephew of Harjinder Singh Jinda. He belonged to a farmer family.

He was born on 4 April 1962 in the village of Gadli, Jandiala in district Amritsar and received his early education in his native village of Gadli in district Amritsar. After completing his early education, he enrolled in Khalsa College, Amritsar.

India today described Jinda as 5'7" tall with a mole on the right side of his neck and two wounds on his right leg.

Participation in the Khalistan movement
He was completing his BA part II when Operation Blue Star occurred.  He left his studies and joined the Khalistan separatist movement afterwards.

Assassination of Lalit Maken
Harjinder Singh "Jinda" and Sukhdev Singh Sukha gunned down Congress(I) Member of Parliament Lalit Maken on 31 July 1985, when he was moving towards his car parked across the road from his house in Kirti Nagar, New Delhi. The three assailants continued firing even as Maken ran towards his house for cover. Maken's wife Geetanjali and a visitor, Balkishan, were also caught in the firing. The assailants escaped on their scooters. Lalit Maken was considered to be involved in the killings of Sikhs during 1984 Sikh genocide. In a 31-page booklet titled 'Who Are The Guilty', People's Union for Civil Liberties (PUCL) listed 227 people who led the mobs, which killed up to 3,000 Sikhs over three days. Lalit Maken's name was third on the list. A press report has indicated that someone named Bakshish Singh was also involved along with Jinda in this assassination.
Ranjit Singh "Gill" was arrested by Interpol in New Jersey, USA on 14 May 1987, a federal magistrate approved his extradition on 6 February 1988 and he was deported back to India in February 2000 after lengthy legal cases and was sentenced to life imprisonment on 24 February 2003. Finally his life sentence was commuted on 20 May 2009.

Assassination of General Vaidya
In 1984, General Arun Vaidya had designed and supervised Operation Blue Star – a controversial military operation ordered by Indira Gandhi, then Prime Minister of India, against a group of heavily armed Sikh dissidents in June 1984 at the Golden Temple, the holiest shrine of the Sikhs.

General Vaidya had moved to Pune after his retirement from the army. On 10 August 1986, General Arun Vaidya was shot to death by Jinda and Sukha while he was driving his car home from the market. According to the police, the assailants pulled up next to his car on motor scooters and fired eight or nine shots into the car. Vaidya reportedly died instantly of head and neck wounds. His wife, who was also in the car, was wounded by four bullets in her back and thighs. According to Indian intelligence sources, Vaidya had been the number four assassination target on lists by Sikh militants and he was one of several people killed in retaliation for Operation Blue Star. Following the assassination, the Khalistan Commando Force issued a statement declaring that Vaidya had been killed in retaliation for the Operation Blue Star.

Assassination of Arjan Dass
Congress (I) leader Arjun Dass was assassinated on 5 Sep 1985 by Jinda, Sukha and one other Sikh because of his involvement in 1984 Anti-Sikh riots. Arjan Dass's name appeared in various affidavits submitted by Sikh victims to Nanavati Commission which was headed by Justice G.T. Nanavati, retired Judge of the Supreme Court of India. He was also identified among organisers of the carnage. Arjun Dass was a close friend of Prime Minister of India Rajiv Gandhi.

India's biggest bank robbery
On 13 February 1987, Jinda along with other members of Khalistan Commando Force, including its chief general Labh Singh, participated in the biggest bank robbery of Indian history and robbed Rs. 57.0 million (equivalent to $4.5 million) from Punjab National Bank, Miller Gunj branch, Ludhiana a part of this robbed money belonged to the Reserve Bank of India, India's central bank. Per Chicago Sun Times, 12 to 15 Sikh people dressed as policemen and armed with submachine guns and rifles escaped with nearly $4.5 million in the biggest bank robbery in Indian history. Indian Police officials described it as 'a neat and clean operation' where no one was injured. As per Indian Express, current KCF chief Paramjit Singh Panjwar was also involved in it.

It was documented as "Biggest Bank Robbery" under "Curiosities and wonders" in Limca Book of Records. Other Khalistan Commando Force members who participated with Jinda in this event were Mathra Singh, Paramjit Singh Panjwar, Satnam Singh Bawa, Gurnam Singh Bundala Sukhdev Singh Sukha, Daljit Singh Bittu, Gursharan Singh Gamma and Pritpal Singh etc. It enabled his organisation Khalistan Commando Force to buy sophisticated weapons like AK-47 Rifles. In regards to this bank robbery, Los Angeles Times has mentioned that bank robberies have been a major means of financing the Sikh militants' campaign for a separate state of Khalistan.

Arrest and death
On 17 September 1986, Sukha got into an accident with a truck in Pimpri, Pune and was arrested. He was riding the same black motorcycle which was used at the time of assassination of General Vaidya. Jinda was arrested at Gurdwara Majnoo Daa Tilla, Delhi in March 1987. He was shot in the legs at the time of his arrest. During their court trial, despite admitting to the killing, they pleaded not-guilty, justifying their actions by saying that Vaidya was "guilty of a serious crime, the punishment for which could only be death". They were awarded death sentences at 2:05 pm on 21 October 1989. Sukha and Jinda also wrote a letter to president of India asking for "No-Clemency" prior to their hanging.

On 9 October 1992, early in the morning, Sukhdev Singh "Sukha" and Harjinder Singh "Jinda" were hanged until death in Pune Jail. The Independent World mentioned "While being led from their cell to the gallows set up in the Yerawada gaol yard, the two convicted killers shouted slogans for Sikh independence in the Punjab".
Both of them were hanged at 4 am in Yerwada Central Jail Pune while extraordinary security was deployed at the jail and in the periphery of Pune to oppose any possible Sikh militants attack. Security was also tightened all over Northern India.

Public protests
The Independent World reported that "..their hanging sparked off protests by students and shop-keepers in the Sikh-dominated state of Punjab" and "Security forces were put on alert in New Delhi, Pune, the southern city where the two assassins were hanged, and throughout the Punjab.".

Memorial service and subsequent seizure of Golden Temple by the government
On their memorial service, hundreds of troops and police surrounded the Golden Temple. In the early morning hundreds of Sikhs were ordered to move out of the Golden Temple. Sikh leaders Simranjit Singh Mann, Gurcharan Singh Tohra and 300 others were arrested in the statewide arrests. Some people were baton charged when they tried to enter this religious place. Approximately 300 Sikhs openly resisted the police clampdown and held the 30-minute memorial service inside the complex while chanting slogans hailing the assassins and in support of Sikh homeland Khalistan. Jinda and Sukha's fathers were presented with gold medals by Golden Temple priest. Police seize of the temple was lifted 3 hours after the memorial service

Honours and anniversaries
In October 1999, his death anniversary was celebrated in his village Gadli, Amritsar district, where chief of Akal Takhat Amritsar, Giani Puran Singh declared Jinda a national martyr while justifying his action of killing general Vaidya. Some Akali leaders stayed away from this function.

On 9 October 2000, representatives of all major Sikh bodies, including ruling Shiromani Akali Dal, the SHSAD, the SGPC, the Damdami Taksal, AISSF and the Dal Khalsa attended the eighth death anniversary of Harjinder Singh Jinda and Sukhdev Singh Sukha. To honour Jinda and Sukha, Giani Joginder Singh Vedanti, Head of Akal Takht (Supreme Sikh temporal seat), performed the 'ardas' (a Sikh religious rite). Both Sukha and Jinda were declared "great martyrs" of the Sikh nation during this event.

On 9 October 2002, according to The Tribune, on Jinda's death anniversary, "Tributes were paid to the assassins of General Vaidya – Jinda and Sukhdev Singh Sukha" and Jinda's mother was honoured by Giani Joginder Singh Vedanti, chief of Akal Takhat.

In October 2005, the anniversary of his death was celebrated in his native village of Gadli by various Sikh organisation including Dal Khalsa, Damdami Taksal, Akal Federation and Sikh Students Federation etc. and his family was again honoured by Dal Khalsa in Fateh Garh Sahib in Punjab, India.

Dashmesh Durbar Sikh temple in Surrey, Canada recently organised special prayers for both Jinda and Sukha in Canada

On 9 October 2008, Shiromani Gurdwara Prabandhak Committee honoured kin of Jinda and Sukha in the Golden Temple complex, to mark the anniversaries of their death. SGPC declared Jinda and Sukha 'martyrs of Sikh nation' and added that Jinda and Sukha took revenge of Operation Blue Star.

References

External links
Letter sent by the two to the President of India asking for no clemency
Letter of Bhai Sukha-Jinda in Panjabi Language
Harjinder Singh Jinda & Sukhdev Singh Sukha Biography.

1961 births
1992 deaths
1985 murders in India
1986 murders in India
Indian Sikhs
Khalistan movement people
20th-century executions by India
People convicted of murder by India
Executed Indian people
People executed for murder
People executed by India by hanging
Military personnel from Amritsar
Punjabi people
Sikh martyrs
Sikh warriors
Bank robbers
Indian people convicted of murder
Prisoners and detainees of Maharashtra